The Tuna Club of Avalon is a private members's club in Avalon on Santa Catalina Island in California.

History
The club was founded by Charles Frederick Holder (1851–1915) in 1898.

Early members included Zane Grey, Bing Crosby, Charlie Chaplin, Stan Laurel, Hal Roach, Cecil B. DeMille, Herbert Hoover and George S. Patton. Among the first honorary members were Theodore Roosevelt, then Governor of New York, author Henry Van Dyke (both elected in 1898), Henry Markham (elected in 1899), ex-President Grover Cleveland (1899), Gifford Pinchot (1906) and Charles Hallock (1907). Against widespread opinion and popular belief, the future prime minister Winston Churchill was not part of the membership. The club hosted  Churchill once, for a unique visit in 1929. On that occasion the then Chancellor of the Exchequer caught a 125-pound marlin.

The club was all-male for many years, but membership to women is now welcome.

Beyond its listed clubhouse, it also leases waterfront facilities.

Clubhouse
The clubhouse is located at 100 St. Catherine Way in Avalon on Santa Catalina Island in California. It is listed on the National Register of Historic Places since April 2, 1991. It is also listed as a California Historical Landmark.

The state marker on the site reads:
NO. 997 TUNA CLUB OF AVALON – The Tuna Club of Avalon marks the birthplace of modern big game sportfishing in 1898. Led by Dr. Charles Frederick Holder, the club's founding members adopted the rules of conduct stressing conservationist ethics and sporting behavior. Today, their work remains the basis for the sport's internationally accepted principles.

The clubhouse was used as a location for the 1974 film Chinatown. In the film, the Tuna Club was renamed the Albacore Club.

Bibliography

References

Buildings and structures in the Channel Islands of California
Santa Catalina Island (California)
California Historical Landmarks
Clubhouses on the National Register of Historic Places in California
Buildings and structures on the National Register of Historic Places in Los Angeles County, California
Buildings and structures completed in 1916
1916 establishments in California